Six Shooter Canyon is a census-designated place (CDP) in Gila County, Arizona, United States. The population was 1,019 at the 2010 census.

Geography
The CDP is located in southern Gila County, just south of the city of Globe. It is bordered to the west by the Icehouse Canyon CDP, to the north by Pinal, and to the east by an outer part of the city of Globe. Six Shooter Canyon is drained by Pinal Creek, which flows north through the center of Globe and eventually to the Salt River near Theodore Roosevelt Lake.

Six Shooter Canyon is the location of the Gila Pueblo campus of Eastern Arizona College.

Demographics

References

Census-designated places in Gila County, Arizona